Herin is an Italian surname. Notable people with the surname include:

Antonio Herin (1896–1992), Italian cross-country skier
Corrado Herin, Italian luger
Danièle Hérin (born 1947), French computer scientist and politician

See also
Hérin

Italian-language surnames